Michael Nyman for Yohji Yamamoto is volume 2 of Yohji Yamamoto's series of albums, The Show.  The album features the solo violin work Yamamoto Perpetuo (a play on "moto perpetuo"), which Nyman has since adapted into the String Quartet No. 4 (originally appearing on the album, The Suit and the Photograph) and the orchestral work, Strong on Oaks, Strong on the Causes of Oaks.  The violin is played by Alexander Balanescu, and Nyman can be heard on one track, "Song L," at the piano.

The theme of The Show was "Cinderella", and Yamamoto desired "Some European folk element" in the score.  At the time, Nyman had access only to some Scottish folk songs he had gathered but not used for The Piano, so three tunes, all of which happen to be in A-minor Aeolian mode, were worked into the score.

Because the album was a limited release in Japan, and not released in other parts of the world, it is something of a collector's item for Nyman fans.

An associated single, "Anohito no Waltz" was also released.  The title track appears only on the single, while "Song L" appears as its B-side.

Track listing
M-1 song A 2'00"
M-2 song B 2'36"
M-3 song C 2'15"
M-4 song D 5'17"
M-5 song E 4'08"
M-6 song F 3'35"
M-7 song G 3'35"
M-8 song H 3'03"
M-9 song I 3'24"
M-10 song J 2'55"
M-11 song K 4'07"
M-12 song M 2'27"
M-13 song L 2'58"

Personnel
Music Composed and Produced by Michael Nyman
Violin: Alexander Balanescu
Piano: Michael Nyman
Recording Engineer: Michael J. Dutton
Recorded at Air Studios, London
Mastered by Michael J. Dutton at TRANSFERMATION, London
Production Supervision & Direction: Nobuyuki Takahashi
Production Management: Atsuko Hamazaki
Art Direction:  Hisao Sugiura
Design:  Hisao Sugiura, Yasunobu Kawajiri (Studio Super Compass)
London agent: Fumiya Sawa
Composer's representative: Nigel Barr, Michael Nyman Ltd.
General Producer:  Yohji Yamamoto
Special thanks to Yohji Yamamoto Inc., Studio Super Compass, Super Muzak

References

1993 albums